Alyona Ryabova (born ) is a retired Kazakhstani female volleyball player. She was part of the Kazakhstan women's national volleyball team.

She participated in the 2007 FIVB Volleyball World Grand Prix.

References

External links
 http://www.fivb.org/vis_web/volley/WGP2007/pdf/P3-005.pdf
 http://www.fivb.org/vis_web/volley/WGP2007/pdf/P3-041.pdf

1988 births
Living people
Kazakhstani women's volleyball players
Place of birth missing (living people)